Bonnaya antipoda is a herbaceous perennial plant belonging to Linderniaceae family. It is native to tropical and sub-tropical Asia and Australia.

Description 
It is a prostrate or diffuse herb usually rooting at nodes. Sub-sessile, hairless leaves are elliptic or obovoid. Solitary pale blue flowers have a yellow mouth. August to October is the flowering and fruiting season.

References 

Linderniaceae